Peter Mather (born 9 September 1953) is a British fencer. He competed in the individual and team sabre events at the 1976 Summer Olympics. In 1973, he won the sabre title at the British Fencing Championships. Mather studied at Fitzwilliam College, Cambridge.

References

1953 births
Living people
British male fencers
Olympic fencers of Great Britain
Fencers at the 1976 Summer Olympics
Alumni of Fitzwilliam College, Cambridge